Siselinna Cemetery is a cemetery area in Juhkentali subdistrict, Tallinn, Estonia. Its area is 18.3 ha.

Parts
 Alexander Nevsky Cemetery (established 1775)
 Old Charles' Cemetery (established 1864)
 Military cemetery (established 1887)
 Old Jewish Cemetery (18th century – demolished 1963)
 Polish Catholic cemetery (1844 – demolished 1950s)
 Muslim cemetery (18th century – demolished 1950s?)
 Cholera cemetery (18th century)

References

External links
 

Cemeteries in Tallinn